Content writing services (also known as online content writing services and content marketing services) is a category of work that first surfaced in the early 1990s, due to an exponential rise in online activities. Content writing services are firms, companies or group of writers that provide services such as blog writing for websites, web content writing, marketing material content, white papers, research articles, proof reading services, infographic content, social media content, press releases, product descriptions, copywriting services, proofreading and editing and many more. 

Content writing services generally charge a fixed per word rate which is popularly known as PPW (pay per word or price per word). However, many content writing firms also have pricing plans that offer fixed amount of content against subscription plans.

History
Adoption of the World Wide Web spread across the globe during the early 1990s. With it came the ability for businesses to represent themselves through a website, enabling visitors to obtain relevant information and engage with their favorite brands. Later came search engines like Yahoo, Google, and Bing. Their goal was to categorize information found on the internet and present it to those who were searching for it. This information, known as web content, became intrinsic to the modern Web in years to come.

Present day content 
The 21st century distinguishes content writing services into multiple segments. Such categorization comes from a diversified approach of presenting information in the World Wide Web Consortium. Today, in addition to its utilization for commercial descriptive purposes, individuals have taken up writing as a means to communicate with their global audience. The main subdivisions of content writing services today include.
 Article - A descriptive piece of text used by companies and organizations to enlighten users on a particular topic. It highly informative and detailed in nature.
 Blog - A personal journal that is maintained by an individual or an organization and needs to be uploaded as and when required. Blogs indulge in an interactive tone with its readers.
 Press Release – A brief news story from an organization’s PR manager outlining recent facts, sales figures, profit margins, new services, product releases, etc. as laid down by the officials.
 Web Content – Visually descriptive & interactive content present on the web pages of every website that highlights the services and amenities provided by a venture.
 SEO Content – Search Engine Optimized Content so that it can rank in Search engine result pages on some particular queries.
 Research and Report Writing – This type of content needs strong research and analytical bent of mind to write.
 Copywriting – Copywriting is the act of writing the text for the purpose of advertising or other forms of marketing. The product, called copy, is written content that aims to increase brand awareness and ultimately persuade a person or group to take a particular action. 
 Social Media Content – This type of content has to be the most compelling, engaging and viral in nature. Used for Social media Optimization and Social Media Marketing.
 Business Writing – It includes Sales proposals, memos, official emails, manual writing and another form of writing which is used by organizations in B2B or B2C communication.
 Landing Page - The pages on which Ads of your search engine like Google and Bing lands. Ads of social media platforms like Facebook, Instagram, LinkedIn and so on also lands on the landing page. Landing Page content writing plays an important role in generating leads. Through the landing page, show the audience the benefits of getting the service from you.
 Direct Marketing Copy - These are pieces that speak directly to a business' audience. For example, newsletters, emails, and marketing funnels.

Industry-wise content writing services 
Today content writing services are offered for various niche and industries. The popular industry-wise content writing service categories are:

 Content Writing Services for IT Sector: Content required by IT industry include blogs, info graphics, buyer's guides, pricing guides, White papers, software comparison content, Software product analysis, case studies, technical content, email marketing content, podcasts, research articles, surveys, eBooks, marketing content, guest blogs, product and service lists etc. 
 Content Writing Services for Ecommerce Sector: Ecommerce content writing services provide content such as product descriptions, product reviews, blogs, website content for ecommerce platform, copywriting, social media interaction content, content for product demo, video scripts etc. 
 Content Writing Services for Travel/Tourism Industry: Content writing services provide content to travel aggregators for their websites, travel guides, blog content, list of tourist attractions, travelogues, travel fashion articles, destination articles, memoirs, travel advice articles, tour guides. 
 Content Writing Services for Education Sector:  It offers content to educational institutes such as schools, colleges, Business schools, coaching centers, academic bodies, etc. These institutes require blogs, academic articles, educational case studies, content for flyers, brochures, and banners, etc. 
 Content Writing Services for Digital Marketing Agencies: Content writing services for digital marketing agencies provide content such as blog posts, social media content, video scripts, SEO content, content marketing material, Client articles, resource page content, web content, guest posts, podcast content, survey questionnaire, etc. 
 Content Writing Services for Small Businesses: Small businesses need content for their website landing page, web pages, blog page, and other web properties. Apart from these, small businesses need case studies, research articles, press release for marketing, SEO optimized content, social media post content with captions, copywriting material etc. 
 Content Writing Services for Manufacturing Industry: Content writing services for manufacturing sector need product descriptions, analytical content, compliance related material, industry news, proposals, surveys, articles about manufacturing trends, research articles, etc. 
 Content Writing services for Financial Sector: Finance companies hire content writing services for website content, SEO content, reviews of asset classes, articles about current financial trends, investment strategies, market reviews, stock market articles, customer help articles, self-service articles for banking customers, financial research, etc.

See also
 Copywriting
 Web content development
 Blogging
 Website content writer

References

Occupations